The quark–lepton complementarity (QLC) is a possible fundamental symmetry between quarks and leptons. First proposed in 1990 by Foot and Lew, it assumes that leptons as well as quarks come in three "colors". Such theory may reproduce the Standard Model at low energies, and hence quark–lepton symmetry may be realized in nature.

Possible evidence for QLC  
Recent neutrino experiments confirm that the Pontecorvo–Maki–Nakagawa–Sakata matrix  contains large mixing angles. For example, atmospheric measurements of particle decay yield  ≈ 45°, while solar experiments yield  ≈ 34°. Compare these results with  ≈ 9° which is clearly smaller, at about ~× the size,
and with the quark mixing angles in the Cabibbo–Kobayashi–Maskawa matrix  . The disparity that nature indicates between quark and lepton mixing angles has been viewed in terms of a "quark–lepton complementarity" which can be expressed in the relations

Lett. B and is ready to be published on Phys. Rev. C, respectively.
Possible consequences of QLC have been investigated in the literature and in particular a simple correspondence between the PMNS and CKM matrices have been proposed and analyzed in terms of a correlation matrix. The correlation matrix  is roughly
defined as the product of the CKM and PMNS matrices:

Unitarity implies:

Open questions 
One may ask where do the large lepton mixings come from? Is this information implicit in the form of the  matrix? This question has been widely investigated in the literature, but its answer is still open. Furthermore, in some Grand Unification Theories (GUTs) the direct QLC correlation between the CKM and the PMNS mixing matrix can be obtained. In this class of models, the  matrix is determined by the heavy Majorana neutrino mass matrix.

Despite the naive relations between the PMNS and CKM angles, a detailed analysis shows that the correlation matrix is phenomenologically compatible with a tribimaximal pattern, and only marginally with a bimaximal pattern.

See also 
Leptoquark

Footnotes

References

Leptons
Quarks
Standard Model